Cezary Żak (born on 22 August 1961 at Brzeg Dolny, Poland) is a Polish actor, known for his roles in the television series Miodowe lata (The Honeymooners), Ranczo (where he unusually played two lead roles) and Ludzie Chudego (Lean People).

He is married to Polish actress Katarzyna Żak, with whom he has two daughters, Alexandra and Susanna. His cousin is satirist Tadeusz Drozda.

He is also the owner of a language school in Gliwice.

Biography

In 1985 he graduated from the Ludwik Solski Academy for the Dramatic Arts in Wrocław. He made his theater debut on March 15, 1986 playing the role of social activist Stanisław Ignacy Witkiewicz in Panna Tutli Putli staged by the Wrocławski Teatr Współczesny (Wrocław Contemporary Theatre). In 1993 he was awarded the Society of Friends of the Theatre in Wroclaw for a young actor. In 1994, he received another award (award for Kontrabasistę dir. Susskind and trophy from the President of Toruń at the XXVIII National Theatre Festival for One Actor in Toruń).

During 1985-1986 and 1990-1995 he appeared at the Wrocław Contemporary Theatre, and from 1995-1996 at the Teatr im. Norwida in Jelenia Góra. From 1997 to 2006 he's been an actor at the Teatr Powszechny (Universal Theatre) in Warsaw. In the nineties, he hosted the game show Ace, Queen, Jack shown on the Polsat television network.

Filmography

1990s
 Sensacje XX wieku (TV) (1983-2005) as Hermann Göring 
 Nagłe zawirowanie czyli most (1993)
 Czterdziestolatek 20 lat później (1993) as a chauffeur
 Magneto w Autrement (1993) as a priest
 Obcy musi fruwać (1993)
 Polska śmierć (1994) 
 Cwał (1995)
 Daleko od siebie (1995) as a pathologist
 Gracze (1995) as the priest Jaworski
 Sobowtór (1995)
 Odwiedziny (1995)
 Wielka forsa (1995)
 Ostatni raz (1995)
 Maszyna zmian (1995) as a cop
 Matki, żony i kochanki (1995)
 Pułkownik Kwiatkowski (1995) as Lieutenant Brzóska
 The Secret of Sagal (TV) (1996) 
 Ekstradycja (TV) (1996) 
 Nocne graffiti (1996) as the captain of the guard
 Wirus (1996) as a scooter thief
 Odwiedź mnie we śnie (1996) as Garus
 Opowieści weekendowe: Słaba wiara|Słaba wiara (1996) as a driver
 Klan (TV) (1997-2006) as Józio
 Taekwondo (1997) as the owner of the restaurant
 Młode wilki 1/2 (1997) as a lawyer
 Musisz żyć (1997) as a psychologist 
 Królowa złodziei (1997)
 Kroniki domowe (1997) as chairman
 Kiler (1997) as a barman
 Gniew (1997) as a cop
 Pułapka (1997) 
 Prostytutki (1997) as the German
 Gwiezdny Pirat (TV) (1998) as Max Rajner
 13 posterunek (TV) (1998) as a telephone lineman
 Miodowe lata (TV) (1998-2003) as Karol Krawczyk
 Niemcy (Germans) (1998) as an officer of the Gestapo
 Na dobre i na złe (For better and for worse) (TV) (1999-2006) as Roman Ziętek
 Tygrysy Europy (TV) (1999) as Mr Lolek
 Ajlawju (1999) as Rysiek
 Fuks (1999) as a taxi driver
 Świat według Kiepskich (TV special for a TV series) (1999/2000) as Karol Krawczyk
 Wszystkie pieniądze świata (1999) as Svoboda

2000s
 Wielkie rzeczy: Sieć (2000) as a cable fitter
 Wielkie rzeczy: System (2000) as a cable fitter
 Słoneczna włócznia (2001) as mayor
 Garderoba damska (2001) as a man
 Day of the Wacko (2002) as a dentist
 Zemsta (2002) as a chef Perełka
 Kasia i Tomek (TV) (2002-2003) as Marcin, a friend of Tomek's from years ago
 Zróbmy sobie wnuka (2003)
 Dziupla Cezara (TV) (2004) as Karol Krawczyk
 Pensjonat pod Różą (TV) (2004-2006)
 Całkiem nowe lata miodowe (TV - a continuation of Miodowe lata) (2004) as Karol Krawczyk
 Sublokatorzy (2004) as the priest Marian
 RajUstopy (2005) as Piotr
 My baby (2006)
 Wszyscy jesteśmy Chrystusami (2006) as a paramedic
 Oficerowie (2006) as Rysio, TV producer Max
 Czeka na nas świat (2006) as a rich man
 Ranczo (TV) (2006 - 2016) two different roles as a priest, and his brother the mayor
 Tajemnica twierdzy szyfrów (TV) (2007) as Harry Sauer
 Halo Hans! (TV) (2007) as Colonel Jabłuszenko
 Ranczo Wilkowyje (2007) (film based on the TV series Ranczo) two different roles as a priest, and his brother the mayor
 Trzeci oficer (TV) (2008) as producer

2010s
 Ciacho (2010) 
 Ludzie Chudego (TV) (2010-2011) as Commissioner Tadeusz Skinny Chudziszewski
 Hotel 52 (TV) (2012) as Lesław

Polish dubbing 
 Kajko i Kokosz (2005) as Kokosz (voice)
 Stefan Malutki (2006) as Stefan Malutki
 Garfield: Festyn humoru (2008) as Garfield
 WALL-E (2008) as the Captain
 Załoga G (2009) as Ben
 Garfield: Koty górą (2009) as Garfield
 Shrek Forever (2010) as Pichcik
 Mniam! (2011)
 Żółwik Sammy 2 (2012) as Filip
 Rycerz Blaszka. Pogromca smoków (2013) as Kelwin Popiołek
 Legends of Oz: Dorothy's Return (2014) as Sowa Mądralek

External links
 
  Info at Polish site Filmweb
  Info at Polish site Film Polski
  Info at Polish site Stopklatka

Polish male stage actors
Polish male film actors
Polish male voice actors
1961 births
Living people
Polish male television actors
People from Brzeg Dolny